Sai da Frente is a Brazilian film, from 1952, which marks the debut of Mazzaropi in cinemas, hitherto artist of success in the circus, radio and television.

Cast
Amácio Mazzaropi .... Isidoro Colepicola
Ludy Veloso .... Maria
Leila Parisi
A. C. Carvalho .... Eufrásio
Nieta Junqueira .... Dona Gata
Solange Rivera
Luiz Calderaro
Vicente Leporace
Luiz Linhares
Francisco Arisa
Xandó Batista
Bruno Barabani
Danilo de Oliveira
Renato Consorte
Príncipes da Melodia
José Renato
Francisco Sá
Príncipes da Melodia
Danilo de Oliveira
Bruno Barabani
Joe Kantor
Milton Ribeiro
Jordano Martinelli
Izabel Santos
Maria Augusta Costa Leite
Carlo Guglielmi
Labiby Madi
Jaime Pernambuco
Galileu Garcia
José Renato Pécora
Tony Rabatoni
Ayres Campos
Dalmo de Melo Bordezan
José Scatena
Vitório Gobbis
Olívio Melo
Martins Melo
Rosa Parisi
Carmem Muller
Annie Berrier
Nôemia Soares
Antônio Dourado
Cão Duque (Coronel)

References

External links

1950s Portuguese-language films
1952 comedy films
1952 films
Brazilian comedy films
Brazilian black-and-white films